Mount Powell is a 13,364-foot-elevation (4,073 meter) mountain summit located on the crest of the Sierra Nevada mountain range in California, United States. It is situated on the shared boundary of Kings Canyon National Park with John Muir Wilderness, and along the common border of Fresno County with Inyo County. Mount Powell ranks as the 81st highest peak in California, and the 10th highest of the Evolution Region of the Sierra Nevada. The west summit is unofficially known as "Point John." Two other peaks on the mountain are informally called "Point Wesley" (13,356 ft) in the middle, and "Point Powell" (13,360+ ft) one-half mile to the east.

History
This mountain was named in 1911 by Robert B. Marshall, chief USGS geographer, to commemorate John Wesley Powell (1834–1902), geologist, surveyor, map maker, explorer, and director of the United States Geological Survey from 1881 through 1894.  The first ascent of the peak was made August 1, 1925, by Walter L. Huber and James Rennie, two of the foremost mountaineers of the Sierra Club, with Huber serving as club president from 1925 to 1927. In 1983 the U.S. Board on Geographic Names revised the location of the summit from Point Wesley to Point John.

Climbing
Established climbing routes on Mount Powell:

 South plateau –  – 1925 by Walter L. Huber, James Rennie 
 Northwest chute – class 3 – June 29, 1931 by Norman Clyde
 East ridge – class 3 – Norman Clyde
 North-northwest face – class 3 – August 27, 1967 by Andy Smatko + 17 others

Climate
According to the Köppen climate classification system, Mount Powell is located in an alpine climate zone. Most weather fronts originate in the Pacific Ocean, and travel east toward the Sierra Nevada mountains. As fronts approach, they are forced upward by the peaks, causing them to drop their moisture in the form of rain or snowfall onto the range (orographic lift). Precipitation runoff from this mountain drains south into the Middle Fork Kings River, and north into Bishop Creek. Maps from the 1980s show Powell Glacier drawn on the north aspect of the mountain, however satellite images show that the glacier has since disappeared, a result of climate change.

See also
 List of the major 4000-meter summits of California

References

External links

 Weather forecast: Mount Powell
 Point Powell: Mountain-Forecast.com

Inyo National Forest
Mountains of Inyo County, California
Mountains of Fresno County, California
Mountains of Kings Canyon National Park
Mountains of the John Muir Wilderness
North American 4000 m summits
Mountains of Northern California
Sierra Nevada (United States)